Gidya is a locality in the Shire of Burke, Queensland, Australia.

Geography 
Gidya is part of the Gulf Country. The Leichhardt River forms the eastern boundary of the locality.

History 
It was named and bounded by the Minister for Natural Resources and Mines on 25 May 2001.

References 

Shire of Burke
Localities in Queensland